Eutrichopodopsis is a genus of parasitic flies in the family Tachinidae. There are about five described species in Eutrichopodopsis.

Species
These five species belong to the genus Eutrichopodopsis:
 Eutrichopodopsis bruchi Blanchard, 1966
 Eutrichopodopsis funebris Blanchard, 1966
 Eutrichopodopsis imitans Blanchard, 1966
 Eutrichopodopsis nitens Blanchard, 1966
 Eutrichopodopsis similis Blanchard, 1966

References

Further reading

 
 
 
 

Tachinidae
Articles created by Qbugbot